The Jamaica Confederation of Trade Unions (JCTU) is a national trade union center in Jamaica. It is affiliated to the International Trade Union Confederation.

Origins
The JCTU emerged from the Joint Trade Unions Research Development Centre (JTURDC) which was founded on 11 September 1980 by the Bustamante Industrial Trade Union, the National Workers Union, the Jamaica Association of Local Government Officers and the Trade Union Congress.

Presidents
1994: Hugh Shearer
2004: Lloyd Goodleigh
2016: Helene Davis-Whyte

See also

 List of trade unions
 List of federations of trade unions

References

"Organized Labor in Jamaica" in A History of Organized Labor in the English-speaking West Indies by Robert J. Alexander, Eldon M. Parker Greenwood Publishing Group, 2004 

Trade unions in Jamaica
International Trade Union Confederation
Trade unions established in 1994